Arlene Nora Kelly (born 8 January 1994) is an Irish cricketer who plays for Dragons and Ireland. She has previously played for Auckland and Kent. She made her international debut for Ireland in June 2022.

Career
Kelly was born in Auckland, New Zealand, in 1994. Her father was also born in New Zealand, but both of his parents were born in Ireland, and her mother was also born in Ireland, with Kelly holding an Irish passport. Kelly played for the Auckland Hearts in domestic tournaments in New Zealand between 2012–13 and 2022–23. In December 2018, she earned her 50th cap for the club. In March 2020, in the final of the 2019–20 Hallyburton Johnstone Shield, Kelly scored a match-winning 110 runs, as the Auckland Hearts beat the Northern Spirit by 67 runs to win the competition. She also played for Kent in 2018 as an overseas player.

Ahead of the women's 2022 domestic cricket season in Ireland, Kelly was signed by Dragons to play in the 2022 Arachas Super 20 Trophy and the 2022 Arachas Super 50 Cup.

In May 2022, Kelly was named in Ireland's Women's One Day International (WODI) and Women's Twenty20 International (WT20I) squads for their series against South Africa. Nine of Ireland's regular players were unavailable for selection, with Kelly saying "it was a welcome surprise" to get the call-up from Ireland's head coach Ed Joyce. After initially only being in Ireland to play for the Dragons, Kelly was in the right place at the right time to get a call up to Ireland's national team. With regards to overseas players being selected, Ed Joyce said that cricketers like Kelly would "raise the standard" in the team.

Kelly made her WT20I debut on 3 June 2022, for Ireland against South Africa. In the match, Kelly took two wickets, including that of Suné Luus, the South African captain. Ireland went on to win the match by ten runs, recording only their second win in the format against South Africa, with the first win coming in August 2016. Kelly made her WODI debut on 11 June 2022, also in the series against South Africa.

References

External links
 
 

1994 births
Living people
Cricketers from Auckland
Irish women cricketers
Ireland women One Day International cricketers
Ireland women Twenty20 International cricketers
Auckland Hearts cricketers
Kent women cricketers
Dragons (women's cricket) cricketers